Terry v. Ohio, 392 U.S. 1 (1968), was a landmark U.S. Supreme Court decision in which the Court ruled that it is constitutional for American police to "stop and frisk" a person they reasonably suspect to be armed and involved in a crime. Specifically, the decision held that a police officer does not violate the Fourth Amendment to the U.S. Constitution's prohibition on unreasonable searches and seizures when questioning someone even though the officer lacks probable cause to arrest the person, so long as the police officer has a reasonable suspicion that the person has committed, is committing, or is about to commit a crime. The Court also ruled that the police officer may perform a quick surface search of the person's outer clothing for weapons if they have reasonable suspicion that the person stopped is "armed and presently dangerous." This reasonable suspicion must be based on "specific and articulable facts," and not merely upon an officer's hunch. 

This permitted police action has subsequently been referred to in short as a "stop and frisk", "stop, question, and frisk," or simply a "Terry stop." The Terry standard was later extended to temporary detentions of persons in vehicles, known as traffic stops; see Terry stop for a summary of subsequent jurisprudence. The rationale behind the Supreme Court decision revolves around the notion that, as the opinion argues, "the exclusionary rule has its limitations." According to the Court, the meaning of the rule is to protect persons from unreasonable searches and seizures aimed at gathering evidence, not searches and seizures for other purposes (like prevention of crime or personal protection of police officers).

Background

Legal history
"Stop-and-frisk" is a police practice where a police officer stops a person suspected of involvement in a crime, briefly searches their clothing for weapons, and then questions them, all without requiring the person's consent and without enough grounds to arrest them. Historically, all major American police forces routinely employed the stop-and-frisk practice.  It was historically viewed as a "low visibility" police procedure and was "largely ignored by commentators and dealt with ambiguously by most courts." 

In the early 1960s, several major changes in American criminal law raised the issue's importance. First, in its 1961 decision Mapp v. Ohio, the U.S. Supreme Court ruled that the exclusionary rule—which prevents the government from using evidence in criminal prosecutions if it were illegally obtained—applies to the U.S. states as well as the federal government. Then, in 1966, the Supreme Court ruled in Miranda v. Arizona that the Fifth Amendment requires courts to suppress confessions that law enforcement obtains without first giving certain specific legal warnings. Stop-and-frisk quickly became a popular topic for law review articles. Several cases forced state supreme courts to address the practice more directly, such as the Supreme Court of California's 1963 decision in People v. Mickelson. Finally, in 1968, the U.S. Supreme Court addressed the issue in Terry.

Case background
On October 31, 1963, police officer Martin McFadden was on duty in downtown Cleveland, Ohio, when he noticed two men standing on a street corner. One of the men, John W. Terry, walked down the street, looked through a certain store window, then continued on before turning around and returning to where he started, stopping on his way back to look in the store window again. The other man, Richard Chilton, repeated Terry's movements. McFadden watched the pair repeat this routine about a dozen times. A third man then joined Terry and Chilton and the three walked up the street together toward the store. McFadden suspected that the men had been "casing" the store in preparation for robbing it, so he followed and confronted them. He asked the men's names, but they gave noncommittal mumbling answers. McFadden then grabbed Terry and Chilton, spun them around, patted down their exterior clothing, and discovered that they both had pistols in their jacket pockets.

McFadden arrested Terry and Chilton, and they were charged with illegally carrying concealed weapons. Both men were tried in the Cuyahoga County Court of Common Pleas. At Terry's trial, his lawyer filed a motion to suppress the evidence of the discovered pistol. Terry's lawyer argued that the "frisk" had been a violation of the Fourth Amendment, and that the pistol McFadden discovered during the frisk should therefore be excluded from evidence under the exclusionary rule. The trial judge denied his motion on the basis that the "stop-and-frisk" was generally presumed legal, and Terry was convicted. He appealed to the  Ohio District Court of Appeals, which affirmed his conviction, then appealed to the Supreme Court of Ohio, which dismissed his appeal. He then appealed to the U.S. Supreme Court, which agreed to hear his case and granted certiorari.

Supreme Court decision
On June 10, 1968, the U.S. Supreme Court issued an 8–1 decision against Terry that upheld the constitutionality of the "stop-and-frisk" procedure as long as the police officer performing it has a "reasonable suspicion" that the targeted person is about to commit a crime, has committed a crime, or is committing a crime, and may be "armed and presently dangerous".

Opinion of the Court

Eight justices formed the majority and joined an opinion written by Chief Justice  Earl Warren. The Court began by accepting Terry's arguments, which Ohio had disputed, that policeman McFadden's stopping, questioning, and frisking of Terry and Chilton constituted actual "searches" and "seizures" under the Fourth Amendment. But the Court ruled that the Fourth Amendment "searches" and "seizures" that occurred during a "stop-and-frisk" were not "unreasonable" under the Amendment's first clause. Both the initial "stop" and the subsequent "frisk" were so "limited" and "brief" that a lesser justification sufficed, rather than requiring the police to have probable cause beforehand. 

Reasoning that police officers' need to protect themselves outweighed the limited intrusions involved, the Court ruled that officers could "stop" a person if they had "reasonable suspicion" that criminal activity was afoot, and could then "frisk" the person who was stopped if they had "reasonable suspicion" that the person was "armed and presently dangerous." Neither intrusion required that police have the higher level of "probable cause" that would be needed to arrest or to conduct a full search. The Court defined this new, lesser standard of "reasonable suspicion" as being less than "probable cause" but more than just a hunch, stating that "the police officer must be able to point to specific and articulable facts which, taken together with rational inferences from those facts, reasonably warrant [the] intrusion."

The Court held that this "reasonable suspicion" standard must apply to both the initial stop and the frisk. First, it said that a police officer must have reasonable suspicion to stop a suspect in the first place. Second, it held that an officer could then "frisk" a stopped suspect if he or she had reasonable suspicion that the suspect was armed and dangerous, or if, in the officer's experience, the suspected criminal activity was of a type that was "likely" to involve weapons. The officer's "frisk" could only be for the sole purpose of ensuring the suspect was not armed, and so had to be limited to a pat-down of the suspect's outer clothing. 

The Court then applied these legal principles to McFadden's actions with Terry and found that they comported with the "reasonable suspicion" standard. McFadden had years of experience as a policeman and was able to articulate the observations that led him to suspect that Terry and the other men were preparing to rob the store. Since McFadden reasonably suspected that the men were preparing for armed robbery, he reasonably suspected that Terry was armed, and so his frisk of Terry's clothing was permissible and did not violate Terry's Fourth Amendment rights. 

The Court ended its opinion by framing the issue very narrowly, saying the question it was answering was "whether it is always unreasonable for a policeman to seize a person and subject him to a limited search for weapons unless there is probable cause for an arrest." In answer to this limited question, the Court said it was not. It ruled that when an American policeman observes "unusual conduct which leads him reasonably to conclude in light of his experience that criminal activity may be afoot and that the persons with whom he is dealing may be armed and presently dangerous", it is not a violation of the Fourth Amendment for the policeman to conduct a "stop-and-frisk" of the people he suspects.

Concurring opinion of Justice White 
Justice White joined the opinion of the Court but suggested that

There is nothing in the Constitution which prevents a policeman from addressing questions to anyone on the streets. Absent special circumstances, the person approached may not be detained or frisked but may refuse to cooperate and go on his way. However, given the proper circumstances, such as those in this case, it seems to me the person may be briefly detained against his will while pertinent questions are directed to him. Of course, the person stopped is not obliged to answer, answers may not be compelled, and refusal to answer furnishes no basis for an arrest, although it may alert the officer to the need for continued observation.

With regard to the lack of obligation to respond when detained under circumstances of Terry, this opinion came to be regarded as persuasive authority in some jurisdictions, and the Court cited these remarks in dicta in Berkemer v. McCarty, at 439. However, in Hiibel v. Sixth Judicial District Court of Nevada, the Court held that neither of these remarks was controlling in a situation where a state law required a detained person to identify himself.

Dissenting opinion of Justice Douglas
Justice William O. Douglas strongly disagreed with permitting a stop and search absent probable cause:

We hold today that the police have greater authority to make a 'seizure' and conduct a 'search' than a judge has to authorize such action. We have said precisely the opposite over and over again.

To give the police greater power than a magistrate is to take a long step down the totalitarian path. Perhaps such a step is desirable to cope with modern forms of lawlessness. But if it is taken, it should be the deliberate choice of the people through a constitutional amendment.

Later criticism

Terry was criticized in 1997 for inaccurately summarizing the facts of the case itself. It was also criticized for "fail[ing] to strike a meaningful Fourth Amendment balance between effective law enforcement and individual freedom."

Subsequent jurisprudence
 
Terry set precedent for a wide assortment of Fourth Amendment cases. The cases range from street stop-and-frisks to traffic stops in which pat-down searches could be conducted on the driver or passengers.  In Michigan v. Long, the Supreme Court ruled that car compartments could be constitutionally searched if an officer had reasonable suspicion that the suspect is armed and dangerous. Thus the compartments are viewed as an extension of the suspect's person. This is known as "frisking the lunge area," as an officer may protect himself by searching any areas from which the suspect could grab a weapon.

The Terry doctrine was markedly extended in the 2004 case of Hiibel v. Sixth Judicial District Court of Nevada, in which the Supreme Court held that a state law requiring the suspect to identify himself during a Terry stop did not necessarily violate the Fourth Amendment prohibitions of unreasonable searches and seizures or the Fifth Amendment privilege against self-incrimination (although potentially could if the citizen in question reasonably believed that such identification could be used to incriminate). The Court did not legalize this process in all states but instead left it up to the states to decide whether they would pass such laws. So far 24 states have passed such laws.

The Court most recently cited Terry v. Ohio in Arizona v. Johnson. In that 2009 case, the Court ruled 9–0 in favor of further expanding Terry, granting police the ability to frisk an individual in a stopped vehicle if there is reasonable suspicion to believe the individual is armed and dangerous. This fulfills only the second prong of Terry (the first prong—reasonable suspicion that a crime has, is, or will be committed—is fulfilled by whatever traffic violation prompted the pull-over). According to Whren v. United States, any traffic violation, no matter how small, is a legitimate basis for a traffic stop.

In Heien v. North Carolina, on an 8–1 decision in December 2014, the Supreme Court of the United States expanded the reasonable suspicion factor of the Terry stop to cover a police officer's reasonable mistake of law that gives rise to "reasonable suspicion" that justifies a traffic stop under the Fourth Amendment.

See also
 Fourth Amendment
 Terry stop

References

Citations

Works cited 

 {{cite journal | first = Devon W. | last = Carbado | title = From Stop and Frisk to Shoot and Kill: Terry v. Ohio'''s Pathway to Police Violence | journal = UCLA Law Review | volume = 64 | year = 2017 | pages = 1508–52 | url = https://www.uclalawreview.org/wp-content/uploads/2019/09/Carbado-64-6.pdf }}
 
 
 
 
 
 
 
 

External links

 Transcript of the oral argument
 
 "A Few Blocks, 4 Years, 52,000 Police Stops"—The New York Times'', July 11, 2010

1968 in Ohio
1968 in United States case law
20th-century American trials
American Civil Liberties Union litigation
History of Cleveland
Search and seizure case law
United States Fourth Amendment case law
United States privacy case law
United States Supreme Court cases of the Warren Court
United States Supreme Court cases
Cleveland Division of Police